The following is a list of Nigerian state capitals.

References 

capitals
state capitals
Nigeria